Proba is a genus of plant bugs in the family Miridae. There are at least 20 described species in Proba.

Species
These 22 species belong to the genus Proba:

 Proba aeruginata (Bergroth, 1910) c g
 Proba californica (Knight, 1968) i c g b
 Proba distanti (Atkinson, 1890) i c g b
 Proba elquiensis (Blanchard, 1852) c g
 Proba fraudulenta (Stål, 1860) c g
 Proba froeschneri Carvalho, 1986 c g
 Proba gracilioides Carvalho and Costa, 1989 c g
 Proba gracilis Distant, 1884 i c g
 Proba hyalina Maldonado, 1969 i
 Proba inspersa (Distant, 1884) c g
 Proba missionera Carvalho and Carpintero, 1986 c g
 Proba nigra Carvalho and Carpintero, 1989 c g
 Proba plagifer (Reuter, 1908) c g
 Proba sallei (Stål, 1862) i c g
 Proba saltensis Carvalho and Costa, 1989 c g
 Proba signaticeps (Reuter, 1908) c g
 Proba tacta (Distant, 1884) c g
 Proba tactilis (Distant, 1893) c g
 Proba vicarius (Reuter, 1908) c g
 Proba vicinus (Blanchard, 1852) c g
 Proba vinaceus (Distant, 1884) c g
 Proba vittiscutis (Stål, 1860) i c g

Data sources: i = ITIS, c = Catalogue of Life, g = GBIF, b = Bugguide.net

References

Further reading

External links

 

Miridae genera
Articles created by Qbugbot
Mirini